Daryl Daye (born February 1, 1963) is a former American football coach . He served as the head football coach at Nicholls State University from 1999 to 2003 and Missouri Southern State University from 2012 to 2014.

Head coaching career
Daye served as head coach at Nicholls State University from 1999 to 2003, and compiled a record of 17 wins and 38 losses. At Nicholls State, he was named Southland Conference Coach of the Year in 2002.

From 2012 until 2014, Daye was head football coach at Missouri Southern State University and compiled a record of 17 wins and 15 losses.

Assistant coaching career
Daye has been an assistant coach at LSU (graduate assistant) from 1986 to 1988, the University of Southern Mississippi (graduate assistant) from 1989 to 1990, Liberty University (defensive line coach and defensive coordinator) from 1991 to 1998, Southern University (special teams coach) from 2004 to 2005 and Missouri Southern State University (defensive coordinator) from 2006 to 2009. He spent two years in the National Football League (NFL) as an assistant to Buffalo Bills head coach Chan Gailey from 2010 to 2011. Daye was also defensive coordinator at Northwestern State in 2015.

Playing career
Daye is an alumnus of Louisiana State University (LSU), where he played football.

Head coaching record

Notes

References

External links
 East Tennessee State profile

1963 births
Living people
Buffalo Bills coaches
East Tennessee State Buccaneers football coaches
Liberty Flames football coaches
LSU Tigers football coaches
LSU Tigers football players
Missouri Southern Lions football coaches
Nicholls Colonels football coaches
Northwestern State Demons football coaches
Southern Jaguars football coaches
Southern Miss Golden Eagles football coaches